Three ships of the Royal Navy have been named HMS Clarence:

 The first , launched in 1812, was a 74-gun third-rate ship of the line, renamed HMS Centurion in 1826, broken up in 1828.
 The second , launched in 1827, was an 84-gun second-rate ship of the line originally called , made a training ship in 1872 and deliberately burnt in 1884 in the River Mersey.
 The third Clarence, originally a 120 first-rate ship of the line called  launched in 1833, reduced to a 72-gun screw ship in 1860, renamed to Clarence in 1885 and used as a training ship. Accidentally burnt in 1899 in the River Mersey.

References
 

Royal Navy ship names